David G. Rand is the Erwin H. Schell Professor and Professor of Management Science and Brain and Cognitive Sciences at Massachusetts Institute of Technology.

Biography
Rand grew up in Ithaca, New York, where his father is a professor at Cornell University. As a teenager he was in several rock bands.

He earned his undergraduate degree from Cornell in computational biology in 2004, then worked for two years at Gene Network Sciences.  He then went to Harvard, where he earned a PhD in systems biology in 2009.  After 4 years of post-doctoral studies at Harvard, in 2013 Rand began an assistant professorship at Yale University in psychology, economics, management. In 2017 he was appointed a tenure-track associate professor in psychology at Yale. In 2018 he was promoted to associate professor with tenure at Yale, and then moved to MIT as a tenured associate professor.

In January 2012, Rand was named to Wired Magazine's Smart List 2012 as one of "50 people who will change the world".

Publications
Scientific
 
 
 
 
 
 
  Author's manuscript at Harvard repository
 
 

Popular media

Notes and references

External links
 Professional Website

Harvard University alumni
Cornell University alumni
Living people
Berkman Fellows
Year of birth missing (living people)
People from Ithaca, New York
Massachusetts Institute of Technology School of Science faculty